Merriman Park/University Manor is a neighborhood association located in the White Rock Lake area of Dallas, Texas (USA).

Education 
Students living in the Merriman Park/University Manor neighborhood attend Dallas Independent School District schools. Schools include Hotchkiss Elementary School, Tasby Middle School, and Conrad High School.

Transportation 
Dallas Area Rapid Transit's Blue Line serves the neighborhood via White Rock station, which also provides a connection to the White Rock Creek Trail.

References

External links 
 Merriman Park/University Manor Neighborhood Association
 Merriman Park/University Manor Neighborhood Association on Facebook.com

Neighborhoods in North Dallas